Lee Harwood (born 4 October 1960) is an English former footballer who played as a defender for Southampton, Wimbledon, Leatherhead, Port Vale, and Waterlooville.

Career
Harwood started his career at Southampton, turning professional at 18 years old after serving as an apprentice. He was loaned out to Wimbledon in the 1978–79 season, although he played just the one Fourth Division game at Plough Lane for Dario Gradi's "Dons". He was released from The Dell by manager Lawrie McMenemy, and spent one season in the Isthmian League with Leatherhead.

Harwood signed for John McGrath's Port Vale in February 1980. He formed an effective partnership with Phil Sproson, and played 15 Fourth Division games towards the end of the 1979–80 season. He scored his first goal in the Football League on 1 April, in a 3–2 defeat to Portsmouth at Vale Park. He played six league and cup games in the 1980–81 season, but damaged a cartilage in August and endured four knee operations, forcing him to retire from full-time football in November 1981. He did however return to old club Leatherhead and later played for Southern League side Waterlooville, featuring in their three matches against Northampton Town in 1983-84, the only time Ville faced a league team in the F.A. Cup. Another serious knee injury forced early retirement from football 1984.

Career statistics
Source:

References

Footballers from Ealing
English footballers
Association football defenders
Southampton F.C. players
Wimbledon F.C. players
Leatherhead F.C. players
Port Vale F.C. players
Waterlooville F.C. players
English Football League players
Isthmian League players
Southern Football League players
1960 births
Living people